In numerical partial differential equations, the Ladyzhenskaya–Babuška–Brezzi (LBB) condition is a sufficient condition for a saddle point problem to have a unique solution that depends continuously on the input data. Saddle point problems arise in the discretization of Stokes flow and in the mixed finite element discretization of Poisson's equation. For positive-definite problems, like the unmixed formulation of the Poisson equation, most discretization schemes will converge to the true solution in the limit as the mesh is refined. For saddle point problems, however, many discretizations are unstable, giving rise to artifacts such as spurious oscillations. The LBB condition gives criteria for when a discretization of a saddle point problem is stable.

The condition is variously referred to as the LBB condition, the Babuška–Brezzi condition, or the "inf-sup" condition.

Saddle point problems 

The abstract form of a saddle point problem can be expressed in terms of Hilbert spaces and bilinear forms. Let  and  be Hilbert spaces, and let ,  be bilinear forms.
Let ,  where ,  are the dual spaces.

For example, for the Stokes equations on a -dimensional domain , the fields are the velocity  and pressure , which live in respectively the Sobolev space  and the Lebesgue space .
The bilinear forms for this problem are

where  is the viscosity.

Here, the bilinear forms for the problem are

where  is the inverse of the permeability tensor.

Statement of the theorem 

for all  such that  for all .
If  satisfies the inf–sup or Ladyzhenskaya–Babuška–Brezzi condition

Moreover, there exists a constant  such that

Connection to infinite-dimensional optimization problems 

Saddle point problems such as those shown above are frequently associated with infinite-dimensional optimization problems with constraints. For example, the Stokes equations result from minimizing the dissipation

 

subject to the incompressibility constraint

Using the usual approach to constrained optimization problems, one can form a Lagrangian

This is exactly the variational form of the Stokes equations shown above with 

The inf-sup conditions can in this context then be understood as the infinite-dimensional equivalent of the constraint qualification (specifically, the LICQ) conditions necessary to guarantee that a minimizer of the constrained optimization problem also satisfies the first-order necessary conditions represented by the saddle point problem shown previously. In this context, the inf-sup conditions can be interpreted as saying that relative to the size of the space  of state variables , the number of constraints (as represented by the size of the space  of Lagrange multipliers ) must be sufficiently small. Alternatively, it can be seen as requiring that the size of the space  of state variables  must be sufficiently large compared to the size of the space  of Lagrange multipliers .

References

External links
A Mixed Variational Formulation for 3D Linear and Nonlinear Magnetostatics
Advanced finite element methods lecture notes
Inf-sup condition and locking: understanding and circumventing

Partial differential equations